Alan Hosie (born c.1945) is a Scottish international referee and was the 116th President of the Scottish Rugby Union.

Rugby Union career

Referee career
When the yellow card was introduced to rugby union - in addition to the red card - Hosie stated: 'This is a bad move, some referees will use it as a get-out, brandishing a yellow card when it should be red.'

He refereed 22 international matches before becoming Five Nations chairman in 1997.

Administrative career
Hosie was a committee member of the Five Nations Championship from 1992.

Hosie became Chairman of the Five Nations Championship in 1997. He was also the Chairman of the Laws Committee of the IRB; and on the Four Home Unions tour committee. He served as chairman when the championship became the Six Nations Championship and remained there until 2002.

He became the 115th President of the Scottish Rugby Union. He served the standard one year from 2001 to 2002.

Family
His son, Andrew Hosie, is also a rugby union referee; now working in Canada.

References

Presidents of the Scottish Rugby Union
Scottish rugby union referees
Living people
Year of birth uncertain
Year of birth missing (living people)